This is a list of cricket players who have played representative cricket for Tasmania in Australia.

It includes players that have played at least one match, in senior first-class, List A cricket, or Twenty20 matches. Practice matches are not included, unless they have officially been classified as first-class, List A or T20 games. The list is in chronological order of the players' first appearances for the Tasmania first team in any form of cricket; where two or more players debuted in the same match, they are ordered by their surnames. The list is complete to the end of the 2010/11 season.

Tasmania in senior cricket
Though Tasmania took part in the first recognised first-class cricket match in Australia in 1850/51, it remained on the peripheries of Australian cricket for more than a century, confined to "friendly" first-class matches against other Australian states, primarily Victoria, and touring teams from the other Test-playing nations. After World War II, even the friendly matches against other Australian states became less frequent. To supplement the limited local schedule, matches were arranged in several seasons for a "Tasmania Combined XI", with the side consisting of some Tasmanian cricketers and others imported, usually from mainland Australia; matches played by this team do not count as first-class games for the Tasmania cricket team, and are therefore not included in this table.

From the late 1960s, with the import of foreign players, such as John Hampshire, Jack Simmons and Alan Knott, Tasmania was admitted first into the List A competitions and then into first-class competition.

The Sheffield Shield is the premier domestic cricket competition in Australia. It was founded in 1892, but a Tasmanian representative side was not permitted to enter the competition by the Australian Cricket Board (now Cricket Australia) until the 1977/78 season. Even then the first two seasons were on a trial basis only.

Whilst they initially struggled to prove competitive at first-class level, the Tasmanian Tigers won their first domestic trophy in 1978/79, capturing the domestic List A cricket Gillette Cup. This was a success repeated when they won the Ford Ranger Cup in 2004/05, and again in 2007/08. The Tigers also won their first First class cricket title in 2006/07, winning the Sheffield Shield, then known as the Pura Cup, in that year. A second success followed in 2010/11. Tasmania has also been twice runners-up in the domestic Twenty20 competition.

Cricketers

Key
 First – Year of debut
 Last – Year of latest game
 Apps – Number of matches played
  – Player has represented Australia in a Test match, Limited Overs International or Twenty20 International match. 
  – Player has represented a nation other than Australia in a Test match, Limited Overs International or Twenty20 International.

Players whose debut was between 1851 and 1900

Players whose debut was between 1900 and 1940

Players whose debut was between 1940 and 1969

Players whose debut was between 1969 and 1985

Players whose debut was between 1985 and 2000

Players whose debut was after 2000

External links 
Official website for The Tigers

 
Cricketers
Tasmania
Cricketers